Ventschow is a municipality in the Nordwestmecklenburg district, in Mecklenburg-Vorpommern, Germany.

Geography
The municipality belongs to the extreme northwest of the Mecklenburg Lake Plateau. The village, surrounded by numerous small lakes, is about 16 kilometres from the Hanseatic city of Wismar and three kilometres from the northern tip of Lake Schwerin.

The district Kleekamp belongs to Ventschow. The former districts of Dämelow and Neuhof were separated from the municipality of Ventschow on 1 June 1992 and incorporated into Bibow.

History
On 1 July 1950, the previously independent municipality of Kleekamp was incorporated.

Transport accessibility
Ventschow has good connecting roads to Wismar, Warin and Brüel and to the B 106 via Bad Kleinen. Ventschow railway station is located on the Bad Kleinen–Rostock railway line. The A 14 (Schwerin - Wismar) runs through the eastern part of the municipal territory.

References

Nordwestmecklenburg